Events in the year 1772 in Norway.

Incumbents
Monarch: Christian VII

Events
September - Charles of Hesse was appointed commander-in-chief of the Norwegian army.
German ceased to be the official language of command in the army, in favour of "Dano-Norwegian".

Arts and literature
February - The first public theatre in Norway, founded in Oslo by Martin Nürenbach, is dissolved.
30 April - The Norwegian Society (Det Norske Selskab), a literary society for Norwegian students in Copenhagen, is formed.

Births
3 January - Søren Georg Abel, priest and politician (died 1820)
1 February - Evert Andersen, navy officer (died 1809)
29 February - Hans Andersen Barlien, farmer and politician. (died 1842)
29 November - Peder Klykken, politician (died 1861)

Full date unknown
Hans Hagerup Falbe, politician and Minister (died 1830)
Sveinung Svalastoga, rose painter (died 1809)

Deaths

30 May – Peder von Todderud, Army general and landowner (b. 1691).
18 October – Gunder Gundersen Hammer, government official (b. 1725).

References

See also